The Solca (in its upper course also: Solcuța) is a right tributary of the river Suceava in Romania. It discharges into the Suceava in Gura Solcii.

References

Rivers of Romania
Rivers of Suceava County